Yar, Yare or Yars may refer to:

Geography
 Yar, Russia, name of several inhabited localities in Russia
 Babi Yar, a ravine in Kyiv where mass murders took place during World War II
 Eastern Yar, a river on the Isle of Wight, England
 Western Yar, a river on the Isle of Wight, England
 River Yare, a river in East Anglia, England
 Yemen Arab Republic (YAR)

Enterprises
 Yar (restaurant), Moscow

Art, entertainment, and media
 Tasha Yar, a fictional character on Star Trek: The Next Generation
 Yar, the hero in the video game Yars' Revenge
Yar, a lemur in the 2000 Disney animated film Dinosaur

Biology
 Yar (gene), a long non-coding RNA gene found in Drosophila
 YARS, an enzyme in humans encoded by the YARS gene